Jean-Philippe Gatien (born 16 October 1968 in Alès, France) is a retired French table tennis player.

He competed at four Olympics from 1988 to 2000, winning silver in the singles at the 1992 Barcelona Olympics and bronze in doubles (with Patrick Chila) at the 2000 Sydney Olympics. He won the World Table Tennis Championships in 1993, the Table Tennis World Cup in 1994, and was 13-time "champion de France". A left-handed player, his offensive style featured a superb forehand smash.

He also won three English Open titles.

Following numerous injuries, Gatien retired on May 15, 2004. Having made his debut with French club AS Salindres, he made his final public appearance there in an exhibition match with Patrick Chila, June 2006. His long list of victories make him the greatest French table tennis player of all time.

See also
 List of table tennis players
 List of World Table Tennis Championships medalists

References

External links

1968 births
French male table tennis players
Living people
Olympic bronze medalists for France
Olympic medalists in table tennis
Olympic silver medalists for France
Olympic table tennis players of France
Table tennis players at the 1988 Summer Olympics
Table tennis players at the 1992 Summer Olympics
Table tennis players at the 1996 Summer Olympics
Table tennis players at the 2000 Summer Olympics
Medalists at the 1992 Summer Olympics